Harold Rivera Roa (born 6 July 1970) is a Colombian football manager and former player who played as a midfielder. He is the current manager of Independiente Santa Fe.

Career
Born in Ibagué, Rivera represented Deportes Tolima, Atlético Huila, Unión Magdalena, Junior, Atlético Bucaramanga, Millonarios and Cortuluá as a player. He retired in 2005 with Tolima at the age of 35, and started working with Tolima's youth categories immediately after his retirement.

In 2008, after two years managing the Tolima regional team, Rivera was named manager of the Colombia under-15 national team. In 2011, after a short period as Ricardo Rozo's assistant at the women's national team, he was appointed in charge of the under-17s.

In 2013, Rivera joined Julio Comesaña's staff at Patriotas Boyacá, as his assistant. On 4 February of the following year, he was named manager of the club after Comesaña resigned.

Rivera asked to resign from Patriotas in April 2016 due to personal reasons, but the club did not accept and gave him a 60-day leave. He left the club on 5 December of that year, after his contract ended, and took over former club Atlético Bucaramanga twelve days later.

Sacked by Bucaramanga on 5 March 2017, Rivera was named at the helm of another club he represented as a player, Unión Magdalena, on 14 August. He resigned from the club in June 2019, and was appointed manager of Independiente Santa Fe on 7 August.

Rivera led Santa Fe to a runner-up finish in the 2020 Primera A tournament before leaving the club on a mutual agreement on 22 August 2021. He returned to Santa Fe on 23 December 2022, as the new manager for the 2023 season.

Personal life
Rivera's son, also named Harold, is also a footballer. He also represented Huila.

References

External links

1970 births
Living people
People from Ibagué
Colombian footballers
Association football midfielders
Deportes Tolima footballers
Atlético Huila footballers
Unión Magdalena footballers
Atlético Junior footballers
Atlético Bucaramanga footballers
Millonarios F.C. players
Cortuluá footballers
Colombian football managers
Categoría Primera A managers
Patriotas Boyacá managers
Unión Magdalena managers
Independiente Santa Fe managers